Viveiro Club de Fútbol is a football club based in Viveiro in the autonomous community of Galicia. Founded in 1923. Viveiro currently plays in Tercera Federación – Group 1.

Season to season

29 seasons in Tercera División
2 seasons in Tercera Federación

Notable former players
 Manel
 Fabri
 Zlatan Xavier

External links
Futbolme.com profile

Football clubs in Galicia (Spain)
Association football clubs established in 1923
Divisiones Regionales de Fútbol clubs
1923 establishments in Spain